The Hobart Rivulet, part of the River Derwent catchment, is an urban stream located in the Hobart hinterland and flows through and underneath the city, in Tasmania, Australia.

Course and features

The rivulet rises on the slopes of Mount Wellington and flows generally northeast over O'Grady's Falls, Strickland Falls, through South Hobart and past what was known as the World Heritage-listed Cascades Female Factory towards the Hobart central business district. As a result of urban development, the natural course has been altered significantly. The lower portion of the rivulet has been piped through the city and runs below the central city area. The rivulet emerges again near the Royal Hobart Hospital on Collins Street before flowing underneath the Cenotaph and emptying into the Derwent. The rivulet descends  over its  course.

Regular tours of the rivulet once took place under the CBD. The sandstone Wellington Bridge (1841) over the rivulet lies under the Elizabeth Street Mall, and is visible through a viewing portal there.

History
The rivulet was an important source of drinking water for the Mouheneener Aborigines, and later for the first European settlers. The site for Hobart was originally chosen in part due to the availability of fresh water from the rivulet. Because of the pure water of the upper portion of the rivulet, the Cascade Brewery was built beside it. There were several typhoid epidemics during the late 19th century due to poor water quality further downstream. It was also an important source of energy for early industry in Hobart.

See also

References 

Rivers of Hobart
Subterranean rivers